Jaroudi is a surname. Notable people with the surname include:

Abdullah Jaroudi Sr. (1909–?), Lebanese sports shooter
Muhieddine Jaroudi, Lebanese footballer
Saeb N. Jaroudi (1929–2014), Lebanese politician
Youssef Jaroudi, Lebanese businessman